Dave or David McCann may refer to:

 David McCann (cyclist) (born 1973), Irish racing cyclist
 Dave McCann (Canadian football) (1889–1959), Canadian Football League player, official, coach, and executive
 Dave McCann (sportscaster), evening anchor for KSL-TV, Salt Lake City, Utah; and play-by-play broadcaster, BYUtv
 Dave McCann (singer-songwriter) (born 1972), Canadian songwriter and performer
 David McCann (rugby union) (born 2000), Irish rugby union player